Orilka is an urban-type settlement in Lozova Raion of Kharkiv Oblast in Ukraine. It is located at the border with Dnipropetrovsk Oblast, on the left bank of the Orilka, a tributary of the Oril in the drainage basin of the Dnieper. The river is dammed nearby forming Orilka Reservoir. Orilka belongs to Lozova urban hromada, one of the hromadas of Ukraine. Population:

Economy

Transportation
Orilka railway station is on the railway connecting Lozova with Poltava via Krasnohrad. There is some passenger traffic.

The settlement has access to Highway M18 which connects Kharkiv with Dnipro.

References

Urban-type settlements in Lozova Raion